The Lubusz Voivodeship Sejmik is the regional legislature of the voivodeship of Lubusz, Poland. It is a unicameral body consists of thirty councillors elected in free elections for a five-year term. The current chairperson of the assembly is Wacław Maciuszonek (BS).

The assembly elects the executive board that acts as the collective executive for the regional government, headed by the province's marshal. The current Executive Board of Greater Poland is a coalition government between Civic Coalition, Polish People's Party and Democratic Left Alliance with Elżbieta Polak of Civic Coalition presiding as marshal.

The Regional Assembly meets in the Marshal's Office in Zielona Góra.

Districts 

Members of the Assembly are elected from five districts, serve five-year terms. Districts does not have the constituencies formal names. Instead, each constituency has a number and territorial description.

See also 
 Polish Regional Assembly
 Lubusz Voivodeship

References

External links 
 (pl) Lubusz Regional Assembly

Lubusz
Assembly
Unicameral legislatures